Bishopton can refer to the following places:

England
 Bishopton, County Durham, a village in the borough of Darlington
 Bishopton Castle, a mediaeval castle in Bishopton, County Durham
 St Peter's Church, Bishopton, County Durham
 Bishopton, Warwickshire

Scotland
 Bishopton, Renfrewshire, a village
 Bishopton railway station, Renfrewshire
 ROF Bishopton, a former explosives factory at Bishopton, Renfrewshire
 Bishopton, Wigtownshire

United States
 Bishopton (Church Hill, Maryland), a historic home located at Church Hill, Queen Anne's County, Maryland

See also 
 Bishopston (disambiguation)
 Bishopstone (disambiguation)